Raymond Eugene Premru (June 6, 1934 – May 8, 1998) was an American trombonist, composer, and teacher who spent most of his career in London, England.

Life and career
The son of a Methodist minister, Premru was born in Elmira, New York and grew up in the Finger Lakes region south of Rochester. As a teenager he started playing the trombone and studied with Dale Clark at the Eastman School of Music's preparatory department. After high school he enrolled at Eastman to study trombone with Emory Remington and composition with Louis Mennini and Bernard Rogers.

Soon after graduating in 1956, he travelled to England for composition study with Peter Racine Fricker, intending to stay a few months. He began freelancing on trombone and bass trumpet, becoming a regular in the London jazz scene with groups like the Kenny Baker Dozen. In 1958, he won the bass trombone position in the Philharmonia Orchestra, where he performed for the next 30 years. In 1958 he married Susan Talbot, with whom he had two daughters.

As a session musician, he worked with Frank Sinatra, Oscar Peterson, Ella Fitzgerald, the Rolling Stones, and the Beatles (on Sgt. Pepper's Lonely Hearts Club Band). In 1964 he joined the Philip Jones Brass Ensemble, for which he wrote several pieces; he remained a member until Jones's retirement in 1987. He co-directed and composed for the Bobby Lamb/Ray Premru Big Band.

After a term as a sabbatical replacement at Eastman, he decided in 1988 to retire from the Philharmonia and return to the U.S. to accept a professorship at Oberlin Conservatory in Ohio. He continued to perform occasionally and to compose.

In 1990 he married Janet Jacobs. In 1997 he was awarded the Cleveland Arts Prize for music. During the same year he was diagnosed with esophageal cancer, and he died at the Cleveland Clinic the following May at the age of 63.

Music
Premru’s compositional output runs from jazz arrangements to choral works, and includes pieces commissioned by numerous leading orchestras, festivals and organizations.

In 1962, he did work on the feature film Reach for Glory in the capacity as music conductor.

In a 1981 interview with Capital Radio, he cited as influences the music of Berg, Prokofiev, Bartók and Ives, in addition to jazz and early Bach studies.  Throughout his career his language remained one of relatively conservative mid-century modernism, with a bent toward gentle lyricism; though he wrote some works in a lighter vein, and jazz idioms and techniques pop up in even his most “serious” scores. 

His large-scale works include concertos for Trombone (1956), Trumpet (1983), and Tuba (1992); Music for Three Trombones, Tuba and Orchestra (1985); a Concerto for Orchestra (1976); and two symphonies (1981 and 1988).  Most were commissioned and premiered by major ensembles (the symphonies by the Philharmonia and Cleveland orchestras, with conductors Lorin Maazel and Vladimir Ashkenazy, respectively); however none have been commercially recorded as of 2007 and only the Trumpet and Tuba concertos remain in print (also as of 2007).

Perhaps his most lasting legacy is in his chamber works for brass, several of which remain available in print and on recordings, including:  the Concertino for trombone and woodwind quartet (1954); Music from Harter Fell (1973) and the nine-movement Divertimento (1976), both for the Philip Jones Brass Ensemble;  the Brass Quartet of 1960; Two Pieces for three trombones (1951); and In Memoriam (1956) and the Tissington Variations (1970), both for trombone quartet.

Discography
 Sgt. Pepper's Lonely Hearts Club Band (Parlophone, 1967)
 Respighi: Church Windows; Brazilian Impressions (Geoffrey Simon), Philharmonia Orchestra (Chandos 1984) 
 ... too scared to play, High Anxiety Bones (Albany 1997)

References

Online sources
Anderson, Martin.  Obituary:  Raymond Premru. The Independent (London), 1998-06-17.  Retrieved on 2007-03-16
Bassano, Peter (Autumn 1988).  Ray Premru: An Appreciation.  British Trombone Society.  Retrieved on 2007-03-16
Raymond E. Premru, Professor of Trombone and Esteemed Colleague, Dead at Age 63.  Conservatory News (Fall 1998).  Oberlin Conservatory.  Retrieved on 2007-03-16
Tomkins, Les (1971).  Bobby Lamb and Ray Premru...(interview).  JazzProfessional.com.  Retrieved on 2007-03-16
Roy, Klaus G. (1997).  Raymond Premru:  Player/Composer.  ClevelandArtsPrize.org.  Retrieved on 2007-03-16
Paine, Anne C.  Summertime Surprise:  Premru Wins Cleveland Arts Prize.  Around the Square (September 1997).  Oberlin College.  Retrieved on 2007-03-16

Printed sources
Slonimsky, Nicolas, rev. Laura Kuhn. (2001):  Baker’s Biographical Dictionary of Musicians—Centennial Edition,  Vol. 5, p. 2858.  New York:  G. Schirmer.  
Anderson, Ruth, ed. (1982):  Contemporary American Composers:  a Biographical Dictionary, p. 414.  Boston:  GK Hall.  
Press, ed. (1985):  Who’s Who in American Music:  Classical 2nd Edition, p. 470.  New York:  RR Bowker  
Driscoll, Anne:  “The Art of Trombone Playing:  A Conversation with Raymond Premru and Ralph Sauer”  The Instrumentalist vol 40 no. 10 (May 1986), pp. 18–24.

20th-century classical composers
American male classical composers
American classical composers
American jazz trombonists
Male trombonists
American classical trombonists
1934 births
1998 deaths
Pupils of Bernard Rogers
20th-century classical trombonists
Deaths from esophageal cancer
Oberlin Conservatory of Music faculty
20th-century American composers
20th-century American male musicians
American male jazz musicians